Barbara Lynch is an American restaurateur. In 2017,  she was included in Time magazine's "Top 100 Most Influential People of the Year" for her pioneering contributions in the culinary world and her focus on local wealth creation through agronomy.  In 2014, she was the second woman to be awarded the James Beard Foundation Award for Outstanding Restaurateur, which honors "a working restaurateur who sets high national standards in restaurant operations and ownership."

Early life
Lynch grew up in South Boston during the era of desegregation busing. She was the youngest of six children, raised by a single mother.

At age 13, she stole an MBTA bus "just for laughs and never got caught."

That same year, she got her first kitchen job — making meals for the priests in the rectory of the church across from her family's home. It was there, along with inspiration from a home economics teacher, that led her to choose a career as a chef. Lynch did not complete high school. "I figured if I could cook, I’d have a job for the rest of my life."

Lynch started as a waitress at Boston's St. Botolph Club at age 15. Its chef, Mario Bonello, ran an elegant white-glove dining establishment. "He was making people happy by cooking. I knew then that was what I wanted to do. I would provide fantastic hospitality to make people feel amazing, with great china and great silverware and a great space. And it worked."

Career
Lynch worked with Todd English, starting in 1989. In the early 1990s, she accepted her first executive chef's job, at Rocco's, an Italian restaurant in Boston's theatre district. "With a staff of 22 underneath me seven days a week, breakfast, lunch and dinner. By the time I was 34, I knew I didn’t want to work for another chef."

After touring Italy, she returned to Boston and was appointed executive chef at the trattoria Galleria Italiana, and subsequently won Food & Wine's “Ten Best New Chefs in America” award.

In 1998, she opened her first restaurant, No. 9 Park, near the Boston Common and Massachusetts State House.

In 2006, Lynch opened what she counts as one of her few failures. It was a produce store called Plum Produce on Waltham Street in Boston's South End. "When I opened it in 2006, the South End was filled with young professionals who didn't like to cook during the week. My lesson was to do more research and understand the challenges of retail more."

Her business Barbara Lynch Gruppo now has 220 employees and grosses about $20 million annually. She oversees a catering company and several popular restaurants: No. 9 Park (a Brahmin Beacon Hill standard), Sportello (a date-night pasta place), Drink (a craft-cocktail bar), B&G Oysters (a seafood joint), the Butcher Shop (a meat counter and café), Menton (a fine-dining establishment) and Stir (an open demonstration kitchen where she offers classes).  The Barbara Lynch Gruppo includes the Boston restaurants No. 9 Park, B&G Oysters, and Menton (named in March 2014 one of the Top 10 Foodie Spots In Boston by USA Today).

Lynch also dedicates time and resources to several neighborhood organizations around Boston. An initiative by Lynch and her employees in 2011 promoted healthy and sustainable eating habits in at-risk schools in Boston.

Awards and honors
Besides the aforementioned Outstanding Restaurateur award, she has won James Beard Awards for who's who of food & beverage in America in 2013, the award for outstanding wine program (No. 9 Park) in 2012, and best chef in the Northeast (No. 9 Park) in 2003.

After Lynch opened No. 9 Park, the restaurant was named one of the “Top 25 New Restaurants in America” by Bon Appétit and “Best New Restaurant” by Food & Wine.

She is the sole female Relais & Châteaux grand chef in North America.

In 2009, she won the Amelia Earhart Award.

Her first cookbook, Stir: Mixing It Up in The Italian Tradition, received a Gourmand Award for Best Chef Cookbook in the US in 2009. Lynch made the 2017 Time magazine's "Top 100 Most Influential People of the Year." In April 2017, Lynch released a memoir titled "Out of Line, A Life playing with Fire," in the memoir Lynch opens up about her personal life.

Personal life
Lynch is a resident of Gloucester, Massachusetts.

Bibliography
Out of Line: A Life of Playing with Fire, Atria Books (2017)

References

External links

How I Did It: Famous Chef Barbara Lynch of Barbara Lynch Gruppo and No. 9 Park | Inc.com

American women chief executives
American chief executives of food industry companies
American women chefs
American women restaurateurs
American restaurateurs
Businesspeople from Boston
Living people
Year of birth missing (living people)
Place of birth missing (living people)
Women cookbook writers
James Beard Foundation Award winners
Chefs from Boston
21st-century American women
American cookbook writers
People from Gloucester, Massachusetts